Rinorea is a genus of plant in family Violaceae.

Species include:

 Rinorea abbreviata G. Achoundong & J.J. Bos
 Rinorea acommanthera Gagnep.
 Rinorea antioquiensis Smith & Fernández
 Rinorea bicornuta Hekking
 Rinorea brachythrix S.F.Blake
 Rinorea cordata Smith & Fernández
 Rinorea crenata S.F.Blake
 Rinorea dasyadena Robyns
 Rinorea deflexa (Bentham) S.F.Blake
 Rinorea deflexiflora Bartlett
 Rinorea dentata (P. Beauv.)
 Rinorea endotricha Sandwith
 Rinorea fausteana Achoundong
 Rinorea guatemalensis (S. Watson) Bartlett
 Rinorea haughtii Smith & Fernández
 Rinorea hirsuta Hekking
 Rinorea hummelii Sprague
 Rinorea hymenosepala S.F.Blake
 Rinorea keayi Brenan
 Rinorea laurifolia Smith & Fernández
 Rinorea longistipulata Hekking
 Rinorea marginata (Triana & Planchon) Rusby ex Johnston
 Rinorea maximiliani (Eichler in Martius) Kuntze
 Rinorea melanodonta S.F.Blake
 Rinorea niccolifera
 Rinorea oraria Steyermark & Fernández
 Rinorea pectino-squamata Hekking
 Rinorea ramiziana Glaziou ex Hekking
 Rinorea squamata S.F.Blake
 Rinorea thomasii Achoundong
 Rinorea thomensis Exell
 Rinorea ulmifolia Kuntze
 Rinorea uxpanapana Wendt
 Rinorea villosiflora Hekking
 Rinorea welwitschii (Oliv.) Kuntze

References

External links 

 
Malpighiales genera
Taxonomy articles created by Polbot